Shaji may refer to:

 Shaji, Guangzhou, area of the city opposite Shamian Island
 Shaji, Jiangsu (沙集镇), town in Suining County

See also